The 1968 Texas–Arlington Rebels football team was an American football team that represented the University of Texas at Arlington in the Southland Conference during the 1968 NCAA College Division football season. In their third year under head coach Burley Bearden, the team compiled a 6–4 record.

Schedule

References

Texas–Arlington
Texas–Arlington Mavericks football seasons
Texas–Arlington Rebels football